Leicestershire and Rutland are neighbouring counties in the English Midlands. Rutland is the smallest county in England and its administration was amalgamated with its larger neighbour between 1974 and 1997. Since 1941, the two counties have shared a single bird-recording organisation, the Leicestershire and Rutland Ornithological Society (LROS).

Since 1 January 1941, the date of the foundation of the LROS, 290 bird species have been recorded in the counties in an apparently natural wild state at least once. A further nine were documented prior to that date, but have not been recorded subsequently. There are nine introduced species that maintain themselves without necessary recourse to further introduction. The total list for the LROS recording area is therefore 308 species.

Leicestershire and Rutland are landlocked lowland counties and most of the birds are typical of English farmland habitat. Many coastal, oceanic and highland birds are absent or rare, and there are few rare vagrants compared to coastal areas. The construction of two large reservoirs, Eyebrook Reservoir in 1940 and Rutland Water (England's largest reservoir) in 1976, has provided freshwater environments enabling many aquatic birds to thrive.

The list below is based on the LROS checklist, using BOU species names, and the status descriptors in the accounts have the following meanings:

Very rare: fewer than ten records ever
Rare: more than ten records ever, but less than annual
Scarce: fewer than ten birds occurring or pairs breeding annually
Uncommon: 10–100 birds occurring or pairs breeding annually
Fairly common: 100–1,000 birds occurring or pairs breeding annually
Common: 1,000–10,000 birds occurring or pairs breeding annually
Abundant: more than 10,000 birds occurring or pairs breeding annually

In the list below, "BBRC" means that a full description of nationally rare species is required for acceptance of the record by the British Birds Rarities Committee, and "LROS" indicates that a description of county rarities is required for acceptance of the record by the LROS Records Committee. Photographs of birds illustrating the list are not all taken within the locality. 


Ducks, geese and swans
Order: AnseriformesFamily: Anatidae

The swans, ducks and geese are medium to large birds that are adapted to an aquatic existence with webbed feet and bills which are flattened to a greater or lesser extent. In many ducks the male is colourful while the female is dull brown. The diet consists of a variety of animals and plants. The family is well represented in the counties, especially in winter when large numbers visit from further north.

Grouse
Order: GalliformesFamily: Tetraonidae

Grouse are sturdy, medium-sized terrestrial birds of the Northern Hemisphere. They have feathered feet and nostrils and short, rounded wings. They feed mainly on plant material and lay their eggs in a simple scrape on the ground. They are gamebirds and large numbers were shot in the past in moorland areas.

Pheasants, partridges and quail
Order: GalliformesFamily: Phasianidae

Pheasants and allies are terrestrial species, feeding and nesting on the ground. They are variable in size but generally plump, with broad and relatively short wings.

Divers
Order: GaviiformesFamily: Gaviidae

Divers are aquatic birds the size of a large duck, to which they are unrelated. They swim well and fly adequately but, because their legs are placed towards the rear of the body, are clumsy on land. They feed on fish and other aquatic animals.

Grebes
Order: PodicipediformesFamily: Podicipedidae

Grebes are small to medium-large diving birds with lobed toes and pointed bills. They are seen mainly on lowland waterbodies and coasts. They feed on aquatic animals and nest on a floating platform of vegetation. There are about 19 species worldwide with five in Leicestershire and Rutland.

Shearwaters and petrels
Order: ProcellariiformesFamily: Procellariidae

These are highly pelagic birds with long, narrow wings and tube-shaped nostrils. They feed at sea on fish, squid and other marine life. They come to land to breed in colonies, nesting in burrows or on cliffs. There are about 77 species worldwide, two of which are rare vagrants to Leicestershire and Rutland.

Storm petrels
Order: ProcellariiformesFamily: Hydrobatidae

The storm-petrels are the smallest seabirds, feeding on plankton and small fish picked from the surface, typically while hovering. They nest in colonies on the ground, most often in burrows. There are about 20 species worldwide, two of which are rare vagrants to Leicestershire and Rutland.

Gannets
Order: SuliformesFamily: Sulidae

Gannets are large seabirds that plunge-dive for fish and nest in large colonies. They have a torpedo-shaped body, long, narrow, pointed wings and a fairly long tail. There are about 10 species worldwide, with one recorded as a rare vagrant to Leicestershire and Rutland.

Cormorants
Order: SuliformesFamily: Phalacrocoracidae

Cormorants are medium to large aquatic birds with mainly dark plumage and areas of coloured skin on the face. The bill is long, thin and sharply hooked for catching fish and aquatic invertebrates. They nest in colonies, usually by the sea. There are about 39 species worldwide, with two recorded in Leicestershire and Rutland.

Bitterns, herons and egrets
Order: PelecaniformesFamily: Ardeidae

Herons and egrets are medium to large wading birds with long necks and legs. Bitterns tend to be shorter-necked and more secretive. They all fly with their necks retracted. The sharp bill is used to catch fish, amphibians and other animals. Many species nest in colonies, often in trees.

Ibises and spoonbills
Order: PelecaniformesFamily: Threskiornithidae

A family of long-legged, long-necked wading birds. Ibises have long, curved bills. Spoonbills have a flattened bill, wider at the tip.

Storks
Order: CiconiiformesFamily: Ciconiidae

Storks are large, heavy, long-legged, long-necked wading birds with long stout bills and wide wingspans. They fly with the neck extended.

Osprey
Order: AccipitriformesFamily: Pandionidae

A large migratory fish-eating bird of prey in a family of its own. It is mainly brown above and white below with long, angled wings.

Buzzards, kites and allies
Order: AccipitriformesFamily: Accipitridae

A family of birds of prey which includes hawks, buzzards, eagles, kites and harriers. These birds have very large powerful hooked beaks for tearing flesh from their prey, strong legs, powerful talons and keen eyesight.

Falcons
Order: FalconiformesFamily: Falconidae

A family of small to medium-sized, diurnal birds of prey with pointed wings. They do not build their own nests and mainly catch prey in the air.

Rails, crakes and coots
Order: GruiformesFamily: Rallidae

Rails and allies mainly occupy dense vegetation in damp environments near lakes, marshes or rivers. Many are shy and secretive birds, making them difficult to observe. Most species have strong legs and long toes which are well adapted to soft uneven surfaces.

Cranes
Order: GruiformesFamily: Gruidae

Cranes are large, long-legged and long-necked birds. Unlike the similar-looking but unrelated herons, cranes fly with necks outstretched, not pulled back. Most have elaborate and noisy courting displays or "dances".

Oystercatchers
Order: CharadriiformesFamily: Haematopodidae

The oystercatchers are large, obvious and noisy wading birds with strong bills used for smashing or prising open molluscs. There are about 11 species worldwide with one recorded in Leicestershire and Rutland.

Avocets and stilts
Order: CharadriiformesFamily: Recurvirostridae

A family of fairly large wading birds. The avocets have long legs and long up-curved bills. The stilts have extremely long legs and long, thin, straight bills. There are about 10 species worldwide, with two recorded in Leicestershire and Rutland.

Thick-knees
Order: CharadriiformesFamily: Burhinidae

A small family of medium to large waders with strong black bills, large yellow eyes and cryptic plumage. There are 9 species worldwide, with one recorded in Leicestershire and Rutland.

Pratincoles and coursers
Order: CharadriiformesFamily: Glareolidae

A family of slender, long-winged wading birds. There are 17 species worldwide, three of which have occurred as vagrants in Leicestershire and Rutland.

Plovers and lapwings
Order: CharadriiformesFamily: Charadriidae

Small to medium-sized wading birds with compact bodies, short, thick necks and long, usually pointed, wings. There are about 66 species worldwide, nine of which have been recorded in Leicestershire and Rutland.

Sandpipers and allies
Order: CharadriiformesFamily: Scolopacidae

A large, diverse family of wading birds. Different lengths of legs and bills enable multiple species to feed in the same habitat, particularly on the coast, without direct competition for food. There are about 89 species worldwide, 32 of which have been recorded in Leicestershire and Rutland.

Skuas
Order: CharadriiformesFamily: Stercorariidae

Medium to large seabirds with mainly grey or brown plumage, sharp claws and a hooked tip to the bill. They chase other seabirds to force them to drop their catches. There are about seven species worldwide, with four recorded in Leicestershire and Rutland.

Gulls
Order: CharadriiformesFamily: Laridae

Medium to large seabirds with grey, white and black plumage, webbed feet and strong bills. Many are opportunistic and adaptable feeders. There are about 56 species worldwide, 16 of which have been recorded in Leicestershire and Rutland.

Terns
Order: CharadriiformesFamily: Sternidae

Terns are slender seabirds with long, pointed wings, a pointed bill and a tail which is usually forked. There are about 44 species worldwide, 10 recorded in Leicestershire and Rutland.

Auks
Order: CharadriiformesFamily: Alcidae

Auks are seabirds which are superficially similar to penguins with their black-and-white colours, their upright posture and some of their habits, but the living species are able to fly. There are about 23 species worldwide, four of which are rare vagrants in Leicestershire and Rutland.

Sandgrouse
Order: PterocliformesFamily: Pteroclidae

Sturdy, medium-sized birds with a small head and long, pointed wings. There are 16 species worldwide, one of which has occurred as a vagrant in Leicestershire and Rutland.

Pigeons and doves
Order: ColumbiformesFamily: Columbidae

Pigeons and doves are stout-bodied birds with short necks and short slender bills with a fleshy cere. There are about 308 species worldwide, five of which occur in Leicestershire and Rutland.

Cuckoos
Order: CuculiformesFamily: Cuculidae

Birds of variable size with slender bodies and long tails. Some species are lay their eggs in the nests of other birds. There are about 141 species worldwide, one of which breeds in Leicestershire and Rutland.

Barn owls
Order: StrigiformesFamily: Tytonidae

Barn owls are medium-sized to large owls with large heads and characteristic heart-shaped faces. They have long strong legs with powerful talons. There are about 16 species worldwide, with one in Leicestershire and Rutland.

Typical owls
Order: StrigiformesFamily: Strigidae

Typical owls are small to large solitary nocturnal birds of prey. They have large forward-facing eyes and ears, a hawk-like beak and a conspicuous circle of feathers around each eye called a facial disc. There are about 199 species worldwide, with four recorded in Leicestershire and Rutland.

Nightjars
Order: CaprimulgiformesFamily: Caprimulgidae

Nightjars are medium-sized nocturnal birds that usually nest on the ground. They have long wings, short legs and very short bills. Their soft plumage is cryptically coloured to resemble bark or leaves. There are about 91 species worldwide, one of which occurs in Leicestershire and Rutland.

Swifts
Order: ApodiformesFamily: Apodidae

The swifts are small birds which spend the majority of their lives flying. These birds have very short legs and never settle voluntarily on the ground, perching instead only on vertical surfaces. There are about 100 species worldwide, two of which have been recorded in Leicestershire and Rutland.

Kingfishers
Order: CoraciiformesFamily: Alcedinidae

Kingfishers are medium-sized birds with large heads, long pointed bills, short legs and stubby tails. There are about 93 species worldwide, one of which breeds in Leicestershire and Rutland.

Bee-eaters
Order: CoraciiformesFamily: Meropidae

A group of near-passerine birds characterised by richly coloured plumage, slender bodies and usually elongated central tail feathers. There are about 26 species worldwide, one of which has occurred in Leicestershire and Rutland.

Rollers
Order: CoraciiformesFamily: Coraciidae

A small family of colourful, medium-sized birds with a crow-like shape that feed mainly on insects. There are about 12 species worldwide, one of which has occurred in Leicestershire and Rutland.

Hoopoe
Order: CoraciiformesFamily: Upupidae

A distinctive bird in its own family with a long curved bill, a crest and black-and-white striped wings and tail.

Woodpeckers
Order: PiciformesFamily: Picidae

Woodpeckers are small to medium-sized birds with chisel-like beaks, short legs, stiff tails and long tongues used for capturing insects. Many woodpeckers have the habit of tapping noisily on tree trunks with their beaks. There are about 219 species worldwide, four recorded in Leicestershire and Rutland.

Larks
Order: PasseriformesFamily: Alaudidae

Larks are small terrestrial birds with often extravagant songs and display flights. Most larks are fairly dull in appearance. Their food is insects and seeds. There are about 96 species worldwide, three of which have been recorded in Leicestershire and Rutland.

Swallows and martins
Order: PasseriformesFamily: Hirundinidae

This is adapted to aerial feeding. They have a slender streamlined body, long pointed wings and a short bill with a wide gape. There are about 83 species worldwide, five of which have been recorded in Leicestershire and Rutland.

Wagtails and pipits
Order: PasseriformesFamily: Motacillidae

Motacillidae is a family of small passerine birds with medium to long tails. They are slender, ground-feeding insectivores of open country. There are about 66 species worldwide, 10 of which have been recorded in Leicestershire and Rutland.

Waxwings
Order: PasseriformesFamily: Bombycillidae

The waxwings are a group of passerine birds characterised by soft, silky plumage and unique red tips to some of the wing feathers. There are three species worldwide, one of which has been recorded in Leicestershire and Rutland.

Dippers
Order: PasseriformesFamily: Cinclidae

Dark, dumpy, aquatic birds that are able to forage for food on the beds of rivers. There are five species worldwide, with one recorded in Leicestershire and Rutland.

Wrens
Order: PasseriformesFamily: Troglodytidae

Wrens are small and inconspicuous birds, except for their loud songs. They have short wings and thin down-turned bills. There are about 80 species worldwide, with one breeding in Leicestershire and Rutland.

Accentors
Order: PasseriformesFamily: Prunellidae

A small family of drab, unobtrusive, insectivorous birds with thin, pointed bills. There are 13 species worldwide, with one in Leicestershire and Rutland.

Thrushes
Order: PasseriformesFamily: Turdidae

The thrushes are plump, soft-plumaged, small to medium-sized insectivores or sometimes omnivores, often feeding on the ground. Many have attractive songs. There are about 90 species worldwide, six in Leicestershire and Rutland.

Cettid warblers
Order: PasseriformesFamily: Cettiidae

Locustellid warblers
Order: PasseriformesFamily: Locustellidae

Acrocephalid warblers
Order: PasseriformesFamily: Acrocephalidae

Phylloscopid warblers
Order: PasseriformesFamily: Phylloscopidae

Old World warblers
Order: PasseriformesFamily: Sylviidae
A group of small, insectivorous passerine birds. Most are of generally undistinguished appearance, but many have distinctive songs.

Kinglets
Order: PasseriformesFamily: Regulidae

A family of very small birds. There are seven species worldwide, with two in Leicestershire and Rutland.

Old World flycatchers
Order: PasseriformesFamily: Muscicapidae

The flycatchers are small birds that fly out from a perch to catch insects in the air or from the ground. There are about 120 species worldwide, 11 of which have been recorded in Leicestershire and Rutland.

Bearded reedling
Order: PasseriformesFamily: Panuridae

Long-tailed tits
Order: PasseriformesFamily: Aegithalidae

Small, long-tailed birds that typically live in flocks for much of the year. There are eight species worldwide, with one breeding in Leicestershire and Rutland.

Tits
Order: PasseriformesFamily: Paridae

Tits are mainly small, stocky, woodland species with short stout bills. They are adaptable birds, with a mixed diet including seeds and insects. There are about 59 species worldwide, five breeding in Leicestershire and Rutland.

Nuthatches
Order: PasseriformesFamily: Sittidae

Nuthatches are small woodland birds with the unusual ability to climb down trees head-first, unlike other birds which can only go upwards. There are about 24 species worldwide, one breeding in Leicestershire and Rutland.

Treecreepers
Order: PasseriformesFamily: Certhiidae

Treecreepers are small woodland birds, brown above and white below. They have thin, pointed, down-curved bills, which they use to extricate insects from bark. There are seven species worldwide, one breeding in Leicestershire and Rutland.

Old World orioles
Order: PasseriformesFamily: Oriolidae

The orioles are medium-sized passerines, mostly with bright and showy plumage, the females often duller plumage than the males The beak is long, slightly curved and hooked. Orioles are arboreal and tend to feed in the canopy. There are 27 species worldwide, one of which has been recorded in Leicestershire and Rutland.

Shrikes
Order: PasseriformesFamily: Laniidae

Shrikes are passerine birds with a habit of catching other birds and small animals and impaling the uneaten portions of their bodies on thorns. A typical shrike's beak is hooked, like that of a bird of prey. There are about 30 species worldwide, three of which have been recorded in Leicestershire and Rutland.

Crows and allies
Order: PasseriformesFamily: Corvidae

The crows and their relatives are fairly large birds with strong bills and are usually intelligent and adaptable. There are about 119 species worldwide, eight of which have been recorded in Leicestershire and Rutland.

Starlings
Order: PasseriformesFamily: Sturnidae

Starlings are small to medium-sized passerine birds with strong feet. Their flight is strong and direct and most are very gregarious. There are about 114 species worldwide, two of which have been recorded in Leicestershire and Rutland.

Sparrows
Order: PasseriformesFamily: Passeridae

Sparrows tend to be small, plump, brownish or greyish birds with short tails and short, powerful beaks. They are seed-eaters and they also consume small insects. There are about 38 species worldwide, two of which have been recorded in Leicestershire and Rutland.

Finches
Order: PasseriformesFamily: Fringillidae

Seed-eating passerine birds that are small to moderately large and have a strong beak, usually conical and in some species very large. There are about 176 species worldwide, 13 of which have been recorded in Leicestershire and Rutland.

Longspurs and arctic buntings
Order: PasseriformesFamily: Calcariidae

Buntings
Order: PasseriformesFamily: Emberizidae

The Emberizidae are a large family of seed-eating passerine birds with distinctively shaped bills. There are about 372 species worldwide, eight of which have been recorded in Leicestershire and Rutland.

Footnotes

Cited text

External links

birds
Leicestershire and Rutland
Ornithology in the United Kingdom
'
birds
birds